Melissa Willson (born 6 September 1980)   is a Paralympic swimming athlete who competed for Australia in the 2000 Paralympics.  She was born on 6 September 1980 in Sydney, New South Wales
.  She swam for the Gosford Amateur Swimming Club. She competed in 5 individual events also in 2 relays. Melissa made all of the— finals at the 2000 Paralympics. She won a bronze medal at the 2000 Sydney Games in the Women's 4x50 m Freestyle 20 pts event. She was trained under Peter  Baldwin, who trains at Mingara Aquatic Centre.

References

Female Paralympic swimmers of Australia
Swimmers at the 2000 Summer Paralympics
Paralympic bronze medalists for Australia
1980 births
Living people
Medalists at the 2000 Summer Paralympics
Paralympic medalists in swimming
Swimmers from Sydney
Australian female freestyle swimmers
Australian female backstroke swimmers
Australian female butterfly swimmers
S4-classified Paralympic swimmers